Nicolaï is a surname. Notable people with the surname include:
 
Robert Nicolaï (born 1945), French linguist
Atzo Nicolaï (1960–2020), Dutch politician and businessman
Jean Nicolaï (1594–1673) French theologian
Patricia de Nicolaï (born 1957), French perfumer